Hibbertia pulchra is a species of flowering plant in the family Dilleniaceae and is endemic to the south-west of Western Australia. It is a multi-stemmed shrub with clustered, linear to narrow egg-shaped leaves with the narrower end towards the base, and yellow flowers with eleven stamens arranged around three carpels.

Description
There are eleven stamens joined in three groups of three with two free, arranged around the three carpels that each contain a single ovule. Flowering mostly occurs from July to November.

Taxonomy
Hibbertia pulchra was first formally described in 1921 by Carl Hansen Ostenfeld in the journal Biologiske meddelelser, Kongelige Danske Videnskabernes Selskab from specimens collected near Palgarup in 1914. The specific epithet (pulchra) means "beautiful".

In 2004, Judith R. Wheeler described three varieties of H. pulchra in the journal Nuytsia and the names are accepted by the Australian Plant Census:

Distribution and habitat
This hibbertia grows in a variety of habitats including shrubland, woodland and forest between Collie, Capel, Lake Muir and Albany in the Avon Wheatbelt, Esperance Plains, Jarrah Forest, Swan Coastal Plain and Warren biogeographic regions of south-western Western Australia.

Conservation statusHibbertia pulchra'' and each of its three varieties are classified as "not threatened" by the Western Australian Government Department of Biodiversity, Conservation and Attractions.

See also
List of Hibbertia species

References

pulchra
Flora of Western Australia
Plants described in 1921
Taxa named by Carl Hansen Ostenfeld